Dimethylene triurea (DMTU) is the organic compound with the formula (H2NC(O)NHCH2NH)2CO.  It is a white water-soluble solid.  The compound is formed by the condensation of formaldehyde with urea. Both branched and linear isomers exist.

Applications
DMTU is an intermediate in the production of urea-formaldehyde resins.

Together with methylene diurea, DMTU is a component of some controlled-release fertilizers.

References

Fertilizers
Horticulture
Ureas